Nathan Hrovat (born 7 June 1994) is a former Australian rules footballer who most recently played in the Australian Football League (AFL) for the North Melbourne Football Club. He previously played for the Western Bulldogs from 2013 to 2016. He was recruited by the Western Bulldogs in the 2012 National Draft, with pick #21. Hrovat made his debut in Round 9, 2013, against  at Docklands Stadium. In round 17, 2014 Hrovat gathered 25 disposals and was awarded the Rising Star nomination. At the conclusion of the 2016 season, he was traded to North Melbourne. Hrovat was delisted by North Melbourne at the conclusion of the 2019 season. Hrovat is now playing for Greensborough.

References

External links

1994 births
Australian rules footballers from Victoria (Australia)
Living people
Western Bulldogs players
Williamstown Football Club players
Northern Knights players
Australian people of Croatian descent
People educated at Carey Baptist Grammar School
North Melbourne Football Club players